Noel Jones may refer to:

 Noel Jones (cricketer) (1891-1941), New Zealand cricketer
 Noel Jones (diplomat) (1940–1995), Indian-born British diplomat
 Noel Jones (Pentecostal bishop) (born 1950), senior pastor of the City of Refuge Church in Gardena, California
 Noel Jones (rugby league)  (1919–1986), Australian World War II veteran and premiership rugby league
 Noël Jones (bishop of Sodor and Man) (1932–2009), Anglican bishop